Kobozev (Russian: Кобозев) is a Russian last name, a corruption of Kobuzev (Russian: Кобузев) from Kobuz (Kobus), a male personal name in the ancient Rus and Poland (from Proto-Slavic kobuz - 'hawk'):

 Eduard Kobozev (born 1979), Russian football player.
 Mikhail Ivanovich Kobozev (Michael Blagievsky, 1874–1937), Russian saint, new martyr.
 Nikolay Ivanovich Kobozev (1903–1974), Soviet physico-chemist
 Nikolay Stepanovich Kobozev (1793–1866), founder of Berdyansk, Ukraine
 Pyotr Alekseyevich Kobozev (1878–1941), Russian revolutionary
 Sergei Kobozev (1964–1995), Russian boxer
 Yevgeni Kobozev (born 1990), Russian football player.
 Yuri Nikolayevich Bogdanovich (alias Kobozev), Russian revolutionary, one of the organizer of Alexander II's assacination